Oswego is a city in Oswego County, New York, United States. The population was 16,921 at the 2020 census. Oswego is located on Lake Ontario in Upstate New York, about 35 miles (55km) northwest of Syracuse. It promotes itself as "The Port City of Central New York." It is the county seat of Oswego County.

The city of Oswego is bordered by the towns of Oswego, Minetto, and Scriba to the west, south, and east, respectively, and by Lake Ontario to the north. Oswego Speedway is a nationally known automobile racing facility. The State University of New York at Oswego is located just outside the city on Lake Ontario.

History

Early history
The British established a trading post in the area in 1722 and fortified it with a log palisade later called Fort Oswego, named after the native Iroquois place name "os-we-go" meaning "pouring out place." The first fortification on the site of the current Fort Ontario was built by the British in 1755 and called the "Fort of the Six Nations."

Military base

Fort Ontario was destroyed by the French upon capturing it in the Battle of Fort Ontario, during the French and Indian War. Construction of a second British fort began on the same site in 1759, but Fort Ontario was only used as a cannon emplacement. During the American Revolution, the British abandoned the Fort, and in 1778, American troops destroyed it. In 1782, the British reoccupied Fort Ontario, and didn't forfeit it to the U.S. until 1796, thirteen years after the cessation of hostilities in the Revolution. 

During the War of 1812, a weaker American garrison at Fort Ontario was overwhelmed by superior British forces in order to stem the flow of supplies from the interior of New York state, but were later defeated near Oswego later that month. Throughout the 19th Century, the U.S. military maintained a presence at Fort Ontario.

Growth
Oswego was incorporated as a village on March 14, 1828, and the Oswego Canal, a branch of the Erie Canal, reached the area in 1829. The city was incorporated in 1848. When the city incorporated, its area and population were removed from the figures reported for the towns.

In the 1850s, at the height of a popular water-cure movement occurring in the United States, in turn stimulating growth, Oswego was the home of the Oswego Water Cure establishment, which Stonewall Jackson reportedly visited in August 1850.

Railroads' role in growth
Oswego is home to the Port of Oswego and once was a hub for several major railroads: the New York Central Railroad (NYC), the Delaware, Lackawanna and Western Railroad (DL&W) and the New York, Ontario and Western Railway (O&W). Railways operated a coal trestle for fueling steamships at the Port of Oswego. Into the mid-1940s, the DL&W had daily passenger service from Hoboken, through Binghamton, to Syracuse ending in Oswego. The New York Central last had passenger service between Oswego, Fulton and Syracuse in 1951. Former NYC and DL&W passenger stations remain, as does a NYC freight station. Nothing remains of the O&W, which was abandoned in its entirety on March 30, 1957. The tunnel from the former O&W is used as a rail trail.

Fort Ontario
Fort Ontario was built between 1839 and 1844. Major masonry improvements to the forts outer wall were undertaken, but left incomplete when Congress canceled its funding in 1872. By 1901, the old fort was abandoned.

The 2nd Brigade of the U.S. 1st Infantry Division called Fort Ontario home until the brigade was deactivated on June 1, 1940. During World War II it was used for interning Jewish refugees from Europe (see section below).

In 1946, the fort was transferred to the state of New York. At that time, it was used to house veterans and their families during the post-war period. Development of the fort as a historic site began in 1949, which included the "Safe Haven Museum."

Today, Fort Ontario is being restored to its 1867–1872 appearance. Costumed interpreters recreate the lives of the officers, men, and civilians who garrisoned the fort in 1868–1869.

WWII refugee camp

In 1944 amidst World War II, President Franklin D. Roosevelt established a camp at the fort for survivors of the Holocaust.

The fort was used as Fort Ontario Emergency Refugee Shelter also known as "Safe Haven," home to approximately 982 Jewish refugees, survivors of the Nazi Holocaust, from August 1944 to February 1946. This was the only attempt by the United States government to shelter Jewish refugees during the war. 

Approximately 1,000 refugees were transferred to the fort from the Ferramonti di Tarsia, a concentration camp in Cosenza, Calabria, Italy. The refugees came from 18 different European countries.

The refugees were placed behind barbed wire, and given no official status, having been required to sign papers accepting their eventual return to their home countries in Europe at the end of the war. Due to political pressure, President Harry S. Truman allowed them to apply for citizenship.

The camp comprised 200 buildings of converted army barracks. The site is now the Safe Haven Museum.

Geography

According to the United States Census Bureau, the city has a total area of 11.2 square miles (29.1 km2), of which 7.7 square miles (19.8 km2)  is land and 3.6 square miles (9.2 km2)  (31.76%) is water.

Oswego is located on the southeastern shore of Lake Ontario at the mouth of the Oswego River, approximately 35 miles north of Syracuse and 69 miles east of Rochester. The elevation is 298 feet above sea level. The nearest city is Fulton, located south of Oswego and north of Syracuse.

As Oswego is located on the eastern shore of Lake Ontario, in the center of the Snowbelt, the region often sees prodigious lake effect snow accumulations. Oswego is one of the snowiest towns in America, with some winters totaling over 300 inches. In 2007, Oswego gained national attention when approximately 130" (slightly less than 11 feet) of snow fell in a two-week timespan. This broke the record of the Blizzard of 1966, which blanketed the city with 102" of snow. As a result of this storm, the school district closed all facilities for a week, effectively shifting the planned winter holiday.

Locations and communities near Oswego
 Oswego: the town of Oswego
 Minetto: the town of Minetto south of the city
 Scriba: the town of Scriba east of the city
 Southwest Oswego: a hamlet located west of the city
 Fruit Valley: a hamlet located west of the city

Climate
Oswego has a humid continental climate (Köppen Dfb/Dfa), typical of the Interior Northeast. The city experiences four distinct seasons, and is located in USDA hardiness zone 6a. The region typically experiences cold and relatively wet winters, and with its location in the Great Lakes Snowbelt, frequently receives heavy snowfall.

Transportation
New York State Route 481 (from Interstate 81) runs north/south to Oswego from Syracuse and Fulton. New York State Route 104 runs east/west from Rochester to Oswego.

Central New York Regional Transportation Authority provides service within Oswego and connections to Fulton and Syracuse. Oswego County Public Transit provides service between Oswego and smaller communities in Oswego County.

Demographics

As of the census of 2010, there were 18,142 people, 7,486 households, and 3,896 families residing in the 8,258 housing units in the city. The population density was 2,343.4 people per square mile (905.0/km2). The racial makeup of the city was 94.1% White, 2.3% African American, 0.1% Native American, 1.5% Asian, .6% from other races, and 1.5% from two or more races. Hispanic or Latino of any race were 5.1% of the population.

The median income for a household in the city was $39,867, and the median income for a family was $57,324. Males employed full-time, year-round, had a median income of $50,074 versus $33,211 for similarly situated females. The per capita income for the city was $21,139. 24.2% of the population and 14.4% of families were below the poverty line.

Politics
The city is governed by a mayor, currently Republican Billy Barlow, and a board of seven aldermen who are elected from the city's seven wards. Recent previous mayors include Democrats Tom Gillen and Randy Bateman and Republican John Gosek.

Political controversy
In September 2005, Oswego Mayor John Gosek was arrested by the FBI and state police in a sting operation outside of a motel near Syracuse after allegedly giving a woman $250 to arrange a sexual encounter with two 14-year-old girls. The arrest came after a three-year investigation that led to charges of the mayor using his city-issued cell phone to “persuade, induce, entice and coerce an individual under the age of 18 years to engage in sexual activity.” The charge alleged that Gosek used his phone as interstate commerce for the purposes of illegal sex and falls under a federal law that is commonly known as the Mann Act. Gosek's term wasn't due to expire until 2007, but he resigned from office five days after his arrest.

Notable people

Neil Bancroft, U.S. Army soldier in the Black Hills War
George Barnard, Civil War photographer and portrait photography pioneer
Joey Belladonna, singer of heavy metal band Anthrax
Owen Benjamin, formerly Smith, actor and comedian
David Branshaw, PGA Tour golfer
Latham A. Burrows, former New York State Senator
Al Roker, national weather anchor on NBC's TODAY
Fenimore Chatterton, sixth Governor of Wyoming
Erik Cole, NHL hockey player, Olympian
Francis D. Culkin, former US Congressman
Noel Francisco, former Solicitor General of the United States
Rose Morgan French (1859–1929), suffragist and peace activist
Robert H. Gittins, former US Congressman
George Grant, doctor and inventor
John Porter Hatch, Union army general
Robert M. Hensel, disability advocate, poet and world record holder
Willard A. Kitts, Vice admiral, USN and Navy Cross recipient
Greg LaRocca, former professional baseball player
Doug Lea, a computer scientist at SUNY Oswego, specialist of concurrent programming and concurrent data structures who made significant contributions to Java
David H. McConnell, founder of California Perfume Company which became Avon Cosmetics
Edward Nathaniel McDonald, businessman
Nettie Leila Michel (1863—?), business woman, author, magazine editor
Luther W. Mott, former US Congressman
Robert Natoli, strongman
 D. W. Reeves (1838–1900), composer and bandleader, called “the father of band music in America”
Dan Reynolds, Nationally published cartoonist, author, and greeting card artist with American Greetings born and raised in Oswego, NY.
Curtis F. Shoup, Medal of Honor recipient
Carroll Smith, race car driver, author
Newcomb Spoor, Wisconsin State Assemblyman
Bob Steinburg, member North Carolina House of Representatives, 2013 to present
Peter Stickles, actor
Willard Dickerman Straight, banker, diplomat, co-founder of The New Republic magazine
Charles A. Talcott, former US Congressman
Mary E. Walker, only female Civil War doctor, and only woman to receive the Medal of Honor
Leigh Allison Wilson, author
Julia McNair Wright (1840–1903), writer

Culture and recreation

Oswego has a long history stretching back to the 15th century. Visitors can learn about the city's history by visiting museums such as the H. Lee White Marine Museum, The Richardson-Bates House, and Fort Ontario. Throughout the city and public parks, many historical monuments can be found honoring historical figures, and other forts that stood in what is now the historical district. The city includes a number of sites on the National Register of Historic Places including the Derrick Boat No. 8, Kingsford Historic District, Market House, Oswego Armory, Oswego City Hall, Oswego City Library, Oswego County Courthouse, Oswego Yacht Club, Tanner Block, and U.S. Customhouse.

The most notable historian was Rosemary Nesbitt, who is immortalized by a monument in the city's signature public park, Breitbeck Park. Every Halloween, she would traditionally let down her long silver hair, dress in a ghostly gown, and tell ghostly haunted tales spanning across the entire history of the city. Nesbitt, who also founded the Marine Museum and wrote various books about the city's history, died on August 2, 2009, at the age of 84.

Ludwig Bemelmans, the writer best known for his popular 'Madeline' stories, was stationed at Fort Ontario, Oswego, N.Y. from 1917. From this experience he wrote the book  "My war with the United States" published in 1937.

Boating, fishing, and hiking are also activities that are enjoyed by residents and visitors. Oswego also has three ice-skating rinks, a large public pool located on the Fort Ontario grounds, bowling, and the historic Oswego Theater.

Every year the city hosts the Oswego Harborfest, a four-day festival of music, culture and food, centered around the Oswego Harbor, culminating in a fireworks display on the Saturday evening of the festival. The event is sponsored by local businesses, and the entertainment is admission-free. The festival continues to draw approximately 150,000 to 300,000 attendees every year.

In 2007, SUNY Oswego Lakers men's hockey team won the NCAA Division III Ice Hockey Championship. Garren Reisweber's goal 12:55 into overtime gave Oswego State a 4-3 win over Middlebury on March 18, 2007. The Lakers captured the school's first ever national championship in a team sport. The 2006-07 season marked the first season Oswego played in the newly built, state-of-the-art Marano Campus Center, located on Lake Ontario. The Campus Center replaced Romney Field House Ice Rink which opened in 1962, and is believed to be the first ice rink built within the State University of New York system. The old ice rink was transformed into a multi-use indoor facility for track, lacrosse and other intramural sports.

From 2005 to 2006 the Oswego Admirals of the Ontario Junior Hockey League played in the old ice rink.

Media
The city is served by The Palladium Times newspaper, Oswego County Today, the student-run newspaper The Oswegonian, as well as OswegoNYlion and is the home to the radio stations WRVO, WSGO, WNYO and WMVN.  Oswego also has its own television station, WTOP, which is completely student-run at the State University of New York at Oswego, and is served by the Oswego High School television station, WBUC. Oswego is served by the Syracuse TV market. Previous media included the Oswego Daily News.

Education
The city is part of the Oswego City School District. The Oswego City School district has one high school (grades 9–12), one middle school (grades 7 and 8) and five elementary schools (grades K–6). The State University of New York at Oswego (SUNY Oswego) is located just west of the city in the town of Oswego. Trinity Catholic School (formerly St. Paul's Academy) provides classes for PreK–6. Oswego Community Christian School provides classes for PreK–8.

Electric power facilities

Oswego generating station
Pursuant to Section 70 of the Public Service Law, NRG Energy, Inc. (now operating as NRG Power Marketing LLC) officially received ownership of the Oswego generating station from previous owners Niagara Mohawk Power Corporation and Rochester Gas and Electric in 1999. NRG was the lowest bidder in an auction arranged by Niagara Mohawk. The facility is a 1,803-megawatt (MW) (nameplate) plant with two steam turbines powered by steam heated in boilers from fuel oil (although one of the units has natural gas listed as a backup fuel). The facility went into service in 1976 (for unit 5) and 1980 (for unit 6). In 2017, it injected 39.7 GWh of electric energy into the electric transmission system. This is equivalent to operating at full capacity for approximately 0.3% of the year. For comparison, the central region consumed 15,819 GWh of electric energy in 2017. Its power is sold into the electric wholesale market administered by the NYISO. Since the plant does not produce much electric energy on an annual basis, it is fair to assume that most of its revenue comes from the NYISO's capacity market. For example, at 1.0 ($/kW - Month), the plant would receive annual revenue of $21.6 million from the capacity market without accounting for actual energy production.

According to the New York State Public Service Commission's database management system, DMM, there was a whistle blower complaint filed against the facility (case no. 92-E-0306) in 1992, however, the DMM website for that case number says its contents were moved to the DMM website for case number 92-M-0016. As of November 2018, there are 5 orders on the DMM case number 92-M-0016 website, none of which have to do with a whistle blower complaint against Oswego generating station.

References

External links

  City of Oswego, New York
 History of Oswego, NY
  Oswego Public Library
 Images of Oswego
 List of famous inhabitants
  CBS News - Ms. Harris vs. Oswego re:sidewalk hazards

 
Cities in New York (state)
County seats in New York (state)
Cities in Oswego County, New York
Populated places on Lake Ontario in the United States
Inland port cities and towns of the United States
Syracuse metropolitan area
New York placenames of Native American origin